Alfred John Barnes (17 July 188726 November 1974) was a British Labour and Co-operative politician.

Born in North Woolwich, he was the youngest child of William Barnes, a docker. His brother Billy became a professional footballer. Barnes lost a leg in a fairground accident at the age of 8. He was educated at the Northampton Institute and the Central School of Arts and Crafts.

Barnes worked originally as an artist in gold and silver. He was an early member of the Independent Labour Party and was heavily involved in the co-operative movement. He was chairman of the London Co-operative Society for nine years until 1923 and was a founder of the Co-operative Party. He became the Party's chairman in 1924 and served until 1945. He was also a director and President of the National Cooperative Publishing Society.

In November 1922, Barnes was elected as the Member of Parliament (MP) for East Ham South. In 1925, he was appointed a Labour Whip and served as a whip in Government, as Junior Lord of the Treasury. However, he was forced to resign in October 1930 - although his position as a director of the National Cooperative Publishing Society was unpaid, parliamentary rules dictated that a minister cannot be a director of a public company (although they could be of a private company): Barnes chose to remain on the co-op board rather than as a whip. Like many Labour MPs, he lost his seat in the 1931 general election but regained it in 1935.

In 1945, Barnes was made a Privy Counsellor and Minister of War Transport, later Minister of Transport, serving until the fall of the Labour government in 1951. He stood down as a Member of Parliament at the 1955 general election.

References

External links

The Times Guides to the House of Commons, Times Newspapers Ltd, 1945, 1950, 1951
(2003) The Times Guides to the House of Commons, 1929, 1931, 1935, Politico's Publishing (reprint). 

1887 births
1974 deaths
Labour Co-operative MPs for English constituencies
Members of the Privy Council of the United Kingdom
Ministers in the Attlee governments, 1945–1951
People from North Woolwich
Secretaries of State for Transport (UK)
UK MPs 1922–1923
UK MPs 1923–1924
UK MPs 1924–1929
UK MPs 1929–1931
UK MPs 1935–1945
UK MPs 1945–1950
UK MPs 1950–1951
UK MPs 1951–1955